The Silver Lotus Medal of Honour is the second-highest award under the MSAR honors and awards system which recognizes lifelong and highly significant contributions to the well-being of Macau.

List of recipients

References 

Orders, decorations, and medals of Macau
Awards established in 2001
2001 establishments in Macau